Lukyanchikovo is a rural locality in Vablinsky Selsoviet Rural Settlement, Konyshyovsky District, Kursk Oblast, Russia. Population:

Geography 
The village is located on the Ruda River (a tributary of the Usozha in the basin of the Svapa), 79.5 km from the Russia–Ukraine border, 49 km north-west of Kursk, 21 km north-west of the district center – the urban-type settlement Konyshyovka, 7 km from the selsoviet center – Vablya.

 Climate
Lukyanchikovo has a warm-summer humid continental climate (Dfb in the Köppen climate classification).

Transport 
Lukyanchikovo is located 23.5 km from the federal route  Crimea Highway, 15.5 km from the road of regional importance  (Fatezh – Dmitriyev), 10 km from the road  (Konyshyovka – Zhigayevo – 38K-038), on the road of intermunicipal significance  (38K-005 – Ryzhkovo – Lukyanchikovo), 17.5 km from the nearest railway halt 552 km (railway line Navlya – Lgov-Kiyevsky).

The rural locality is situated 55 km from Kursk Vostochny Airport, 160 km from Belgorod International Airport and 253 km from Voronezh Peter the Great Airport.

References

Notes

Sources

Rural localities in Konyshyovsky District
Dmitriyevsky Uyezd